Paadrema Nature Reserve is a nature reserve situated in south-western Estonia, in Pärnu County.

The nature reserve of Paadrema is centred on Paadrema fen, surrounded by old-growth forest and swamps. Typical plants that grow in the area include several species of orchid and sweet gale. Among birds, white-tailed eagle, white-spotted bluethroat, red-backed shrike and common crane can be found in the nature reserve.

References

Nature reserves in Estonia
Geography of Pärnu County
Tourist attractions in Pärnu County